Eric Robinson may refer to:

 Eric Robinson (conductor) (1908–1974), British conductor
 Eric Robinson (Canadian politician) (born 1953), Canadian politician in Manitoba
 Eric Robinson (Australian politician) (1929–1981), Australian federal politician
 Eric Gascoigne Robinson (1882–1965), British Victoria Cross winner
 Eric Robinson (water polo), British water polo player
 Eric Robinson (veterinarian), South African veterinarian
 Eric Robinson (ice hockey) (born 1995), American ice hockey player
 Eric W. Robinson, American historian